Vasula deltoidea is a species of sea snail, a marine gastropod mollusk in the family Muricidae, the murex snails or rock snails.

Description
The length of the shell attains 37 mm. 

The shell is light brown or whitish, with dark chestnut bands, which sometimes appear also on the inside of the outer lip. The  columella is pink. 

This is a shallow water species, often prone to significant encrustation by calcareous algae.

Distribution
Known from the Atlantic coast of Florida and also from Barbados, Lesser Antilles, and Venezuela.

References

 Garrigues B. & Lamy D. (2019). Inventaire des Muricidae récoltés au cours de la campagne MADIBENTHOS du MNHN en Martinique (Antilles Françaises) et description de 12 nouvelles espèces des genres Dermomurex, Attilosa, Acanthotrophon, Favartia, Muricopsis et Pygmaepterys (Mollusca, Gastropoda). Xenophora Taxonomy. 23: 22-59.

External links
  Claremont M., Vermeij G.J., Williams S.T. & Reid D.G. (2013) Global phylogeny and new classification of the Rapaninae (Gastropoda: Muricidae), dominant molluscan predators on tropical rocky seashores. Molecular Phylogenetics and Evolution 66: 91–102. 
 Lamarck, [J.-B. M. de. (1822). Histoire naturelle des animaux sans vertèbres. Tome septième. Paris: published by the Author, 711 pp]
 Blainville, H. M. D. de. (1832). Disposition méthodique des espèces récentes et fossiles des genres Pourpre, Ricinule, Licorne et Concholépas de M. de Lamarck, et description des espèces nouvelles ou peu connues, faisant partie de la collection du Muséum d'Histoire Naturelle de Paris. Nouvelles Annales du Muséum d'Histoire Naturelle. 1: 189-263, pls 9-12

Vasula
Gastropods described in 1822